The Duck Creek Formation is a geologic formation in Texas. It preserves fossils dating back to the Cretaceous period.

Invertebrate Paleofauna

Neithia
Gryphaea
Eopachydiscus
 E. marcianus
E. laevicanaliculatum

Mortoniceras
 M. equidistans
 M. fortworthens
Idohamites fredmonti
Macraster

Vertebrate Paleofauna
 
Leptostyrax macrorhiza
Xiphactinus

See also

 List of fossiliferous stratigraphic units in Texas
 Paleontology in Texas

References
 

Cretaceous geology of Texas